Stephen Edward Farish (born 12 August 1970) is an English international bowls player.

In 2002 he won a silver medal with Dean Morgan in the pairs at the 2002 Commonwealth Games in Manchester.

In 2008 he won a bronze medal with Mark Bantock, Robert Newman and Graham Shadwell in the fours at the 2008 World Outdoor Bowls Championship in Christchurch.

He has won three National Championship titles in 1992, 1997 and 2000.

References

External links
 
 

1970 births
Living people
English male bowls players
Commonwealth Games medallists in lawn bowls
Commonwealth Games silver medallists for England
Bowls players at the 2002 Commonwealth Games
Bowls players at the 2006 Commonwealth Games
Medallists at the 2002 Commonwealth Games